The Quiver (18611956) was a weekly magazine published by Cassell's and was "designed for the defence and promotion of biblical truth and the advance of religion in the homes of the people."

History

John Cassell (18171865), the English publisher and temperance advocate conceived the idea of a periodical which would supply Sunday reading for the family while touring America in 18591860.

The first number (in the First Series) appeared on 7 September 1861. It had twenty four pages, set in small type, had no illustrations and cost one penny. It was initially in broadsheet format, but had changed to octavo format by 1864. In 1864 John Cassell published a Prospectus for a new series of the Quiver, which announced a new illustrated series (the Second Series) of the magazine, again with a one-penny weekly edition and a sixpenny monthly edition, beginning on 21 September 1864. A Third Series, now with "toned paper" began in September 1865, and this series continued until closure. With series three (if not Series Two also) the cover of the weekly edition featured a three quarter page illustration with the magazine title above and the start of an article below. The monthly magazine cover had an illustration.
 
Nowell-Smith said that Cassell's prescription for the magazine was to have one article each:
To address the intellect
Full of gushing feeling to address the heart
Of a literary theme
Of a juvenile tale.
 
Teignmouth Shore says that when he became editor of the magazine in 1863 "it was a penny weekly publication, and four or five of these weekly numbers were bound up into a monthly part and sold for sixpence." However, the circulation of the weekly editions was declining and the monthly edition increasing, which led Teignmouth proposing that they publish a monthly edition that was not merely bound up weekly editions.. The publishers agreed and in 1865 the monthly magazine became a separate entity rather collating the weekly edition. It was priced at sixpence an issue. However, they continued to publish a penny weekly edition until September 1879.

The magazine was still priced at sixpence in 1902, and must have had a large circulation as the advertising rate was £6 for one eight of a page.

On occasion, The Quiver featured poetry. Both Janet Hamilton and Emily Chubbuck (under her pseudonym "Fanny Forester") published in the magazine.

Notable contributors
The Quiver drew in a number of notable contributors, especially during its high period in the nineteenth century:
Florence L. Barclay
Christine Chaundler
William Boyd Carpenter
Frederic William Farrar (under the pseudonym F T L Hope)
Louisa Lilias Plunket Greene
Janet Hamilton
Mary Howitt
Joseph Butterworth Owen
Felicia Skene

Editors
The magazine had relatively few editors over its history, with the last editor holding his post for nearly 50 years. The editors were:
John Cassell (23 January 18172 April 1865), the founder and initial editor. Forced to give up the editorship due to increasing ill-health.
Rev. Henry Wright 
J. E. Gore
J. Willis Clark
Rev. Thomas Teignmouth Shore (28 December 18413 December 1911) became editor of Quiver in 1863 and relinquished it when he became Chief Editor at Cassell's in 1865.
Hunt, Bonavia (30 July 184727 September 1917) editor from 1865 to 1905.
David Williamson, editor from 1905 to 1909.
Williams, Herbert Darkin 26 April 18824 August 1972) editor from 1909.

Example of cover illustrations for the weekly Quiver
The following three-quarter page illustrations by George John Pinwell (26 December 1842 – 8 September 1875) for Volume II (September 1866September 1867) of the third series (Toned Paper Series) of the magazine are typical. Each of these illustrations appeared with the title of the magazine above, and the start of an article below. The illustration was not necessarily related to the following article, but included a page number showing what article the illustration related to. Illustrations by courtesy of the Hathi Trust.

Notes

References

Weekly magazines published in the United Kingdom
Monthly magazines published in the United Kingdom
Defunct magazines published in the United Kingdom
Magazines established in 1861
Magazines disestablished in 1956